Zhong Weiping (born October 23, 1981 in Shanghai) is a female Chinese épée fencer.

Zhong won the gold medal in the épée team event at the 2006 World Fencing Championships after beating France in the final. She accomplished this with her team mates Li Na, Luo Xiaojuan and Zhang Li. She also competed for China at the 2004 Athens Olympics, finishing 10th in the individual épée and 6th in the team épée events.

References

Achievements
 2006 World Fencing Championships, team épée

1981 births
Living people
Fencers at the 2004 Summer Olympics
Fencers at the 2008 Summer Olympics
Olympic fencers of China
Fencers from Shanghai
Chinese female fencers
Asian Games medalists in fencing
Fencers at the 2002 Asian Games
Fencers at the 2006 Asian Games
Asian Games gold medalists for China
Asian Games silver medalists for China
Medalists at the 2002 Asian Games
Medalists at the 2006 Asian Games
21st-century Chinese women